Autry Beamon (born November 12, 1953) is a former professional American football safety who played for three National Football League (NFL) teams.

He played college football at East Texas State University.

Over the course of his career, Beamon made 143 blocks.

References

1953 births
Living people
Players of American football from Texas
American football cornerbacks
Seattle Seahawks players
Minnesota Vikings players
Cleveland Browns players
Texas A&M–Commerce Lions football players
People from Terrell, Texas